Lois Ruth Maxwell (born Lois Ruth Hooker; February 14, 1927 – September 29, 2007) was a Canadian actress who portrayed Miss Moneypenny in the first fourteen Eon-produced James Bond films (1962–1985). She was the first actress to play the part. The films in which she played Miss Moneypenny were Dr. No (1962), From Russia with Love (1963), Goldfinger (1964), Thunderball (1965), You Only Live Twice (1967), On Her Majesty's Secret Service (1969), Diamonds Are Forever (1971), Live and Let Die (1973), The Man with the Golden Gun (1974), The Spy Who Loved Me (1977), Moonraker (1979), For Your Eyes Only (1981), Octopussy (1983), and A View to a Kill (1985). She did not appear in the 1967 adaptation of Casino Royale, nor in the 1983 remake of Thunderball, Never Say Never Again, as the production was not Eon's, though she did, as a similar character, in the spoof O.K. Connery.

She began her film career in the late 1940s, and won the Golden Globe Award for Most Promising Newcomer for her performance in That Hagen Girl (1947). Following a number of small film roles, she became dissatisfied and travelled to Italy, where she worked in film from 1951 to 1955. After her marriage, she moved to the United Kingdom, where she appeared in several television productions.

As Maxwell's career declined, she lived in Canada, Switzerland, and the UK. In 2001, she was diagnosed with bowel cancer and moved to Western Australia, where she lived with her son until her death, aged 80, in 2007.

Life and career

Early life
Maxwell was born in Kitchener, Ontario, to a Ruth Adelaide Wells, a nurse, and William Victor Hooker, a teacher. Maxwell was raised in Toronto and attended Lawrence Park Collegiate Institute. She gained her first job working as a waitress at Canada's largest and most luxurious Summer resort, Bigwin Inn, on Bigwin Island in Lake of Bays, Ontario.

During World War II she ran away from home, aged 15, to join the Canadian Women's Army Corps, a unit formed to release men for combat duties. CWAC personnel were secretaries, vehicle drivers, and mechanics, who performed every conceivable noncombat duty. Maxwell quickly became part of the Army Show in Canada. Later, as part of the Canadian Auxiliary Services Entertainment Unit, she was posted to the United Kingdom, where she performed music and dance numbers to entertain the troops, often appearing alongside Canadian comedians Wayne and Shuster.

Maxwell's true age was discovered when the group reached London. To avoid her being repatriated to Canada, she was discharged; she subsequently enrolled at the Royal Academy of Dramatic Art, where she became friends with fellow student Roger Moore. Moore was later her on-screen colleague, in the James Bond film series, from Live and Let Die (1973) to A View to a Kill (1985).

Career
Moving to Hollywood at the age of 20, Maxwell won the actress Golden Globe Award for Most Promising Newcomer for her role in the Shirley Temple drama That Hagen Girl (1947). In 1949, she participated in a later famous Life magazine photo layout, in which she posed with other up-and-coming actresses, Marilyn Monroe, Cathy Downs, Suzanne Dalbert, Enrica Soma, Laurette Luez and Jane Nigh. It was at this time that she changed her surname from Hooker to Maxwell, a name borrowed from a ballet dancer friend. The rest of her family also took this name.

Most of Maxwell's work consisted of minor roles in B films. Tiring of Hollywood, she moved back to Europe, living in Rome for five years (1950–1955). There she made a series of films, and at one point became an amateur race driver. One of her Italian films was an adaptation of the opera Aida (1953), in which Maxwell played a leading role, lip-synching to another woman's vocals and appearing in several scenes with the then unknown Sophia Loren.

While visiting Paris, she met her future husband, TV executive Peter Marriott. They married in 1957 and moved to London, where their daughter Melinda and son Christian were both born (in 1958 and 1959). Maxwell appeared with Patrick McGoohan in the British television series Danger Man as his accomplice in the 1959 episode "Position of Trust".

During the 1960s, Maxwell appeared in many TV series and in films outside the Bond series, in both the UK and Canada. She guest-starred in two episodes of The Saint and later in one episode of The Persuaders!; in both of which she appeared alongside Roger Moore. She provided the voice of Atlanta for the Supermarionation science-fiction children's series Stingray and was the star of the CBC series Adventures in Rainbow Country from 1970 to 1971.

Maxwell had a minor role as a nurse in Stanley Kubrick's Lolita (1962). In 1963 Maxwell played a machine gun-firing nurse in the series The Avengers (episode "The Little Wonders", which was first aired on 11 January 1964). She had a guest appearance in an episode of the ITC series The Baron ("Something for a Rainy Day", 1965), as an insurance investigator.

Role as Miss Moneypenny
Maxwell lobbied for a role in the James Bond film Dr. No (1962), for her husband had suffered a heart attack and they needed the money. Director Terence Young, who had once turned her down on the grounds that she "looked like she smelled of soap", offered her either Miss Moneypenny or Bond's girlfriend, Sylvia Trench, but she was uncomfortable with the idea of a revealing scene outlined in the screenplay. The role as M's secretary guaranteed just two days' work at a rate of £100 per day; Maxwell supplied her own clothes for the filming.

Maxwell appeared in the Italian spy spoof Operation Kid Brother in 1967, with Bernard Lee (who played M) and Sean Connery's brother Neil. In the same year she portrayed Moneypenny in a made-for-TV special, Welcome to Japan, Mr. Bond, in which she co-starred with Kate O'Mara and Desmond Llewelyn.

The role of Moneypenny was nearly recast after Maxwell demanded a pay raise for Diamonds Are Forever (1971). However, the producers felt it important to incorporate the regular character, and it was ultimately decided during production to add the scene where, disguised as a customs officer, she gives Bond his travel documents at the Port of Dover. Maxwell and Sean Connery filmed their lines separately and were not present together for the short scene. Moneypenny's undercover policewoman's cap disguises the hair Maxwell had already dyed in preparation for another part.

Maxwell stayed on as Moneypenny when her former classmate Roger Moore assumed the role of 007 in Live and Let Die (1973). She reprised her character, weeping for the death of Bond, in a short scene with Bernard Lee in the French comedy Bons baisers de Hong Kong (1975).

During the filming of A View to a Kill (1985), her final appearance as Moneypenny, producer Albert R. Broccoli pointed out to her that they were the only cast or crew members from Dr. No who had not yet left the series. Maxwell asked that Moneypenny be killed off, but Broccoli recast the role instead.

According to author Tom Lisanti, Maxwell's Moneypenny was seen as an "anchor", and her flirtatious relationship with Bond provided the films with dramatic realism and humanism; for Moneypenny, Bond was "unobtainable", freeing the characters to make outrageous sexual double entendres.

Later life
Maxwell's husband died in 1973, having never fully recovered from his heart attack in the 1960s. Maxwell subsequently returned to Canada, settling in Fort Erie, Ontario, where she lived on Oakes Drive. She spent her summers at a cottage outside Espanola, Ontario, where she wrote a weekly column for the Toronto Sun under the pseudonym "Miss Moneypenny" from 1979 until 1994, and became a businesswoman working in the textile industry. In 1994, she returned to the UK once again to be nearer to her daughter Melinda, retiring to a cottage in Frome, Somerset. A plaque has been placed on her home there by the Frome Society of Local Study.

Death
Following surgery for bowel cancer in 2001, Maxwell moved to Perth, Western Australia, to live with her son Christian's family. She remained there, working on her autobiography, until her death at Fremantle Hospital on 29 September 2007.

Of his friend's death, Sir Roger Moore said to BBC Radio 5 Live, "It's rather a shock. She was always fun and she was wonderful to be with and was absolutely perfect casting [...] It was a great pity that, after I moved out of Bond, they didn't take her on to continue in the Timothy Dalton films. I think it was a great disappointment to her that she had not been promoted to play M. She would have been a wonderful M."

Partial filmography

 A Matter of Life and Death (1946) as Actress (uncredited)
 Spring Song (1946) as Penelope Cobb (uncredited)
 That Hagen Girl (1947) as Julia Kane
 Corridor of Mirrors (1948) as Lois
 The Big Punch (1948) as Karen Long 
 The Dark Past (1948) as Ruth Collins
 The Decision of Christopher Blake (1948) as Miss McIntyre (uncredited)
 Crime Doctor's Diary (1949) as Jane Darrin
 Kazan (1949) as Louise Maitlin
 Tomorrow Is Too Late (1950) as Signorina Anna
 Love and Poison (1950) as Queen Christina
 Brief Rapture (1951) as Erika
 The Woman's Angle (1952) as Enid Mansell
 Viva il cinema! (1952)
 Ha da venì... don Calogero (1952) as Maestrina
 Lady in the Fog (1952) as Margaret 'Peggy' Maybrick
 Women of Twilight (1952) as Chris Ralston, the New Mother
 Mantrap (1953) as Thelma Speight / Tasman
 Aida (1953) as Amneris
 La Grande Speranza (1955) as Lt. Lily Donald
 Passport to Treason (1956) as Diane Boyd
 Satellite in the Sky (1956) as Kim
 High Terrace (1956) as Stephanie Blake
 Time Without Pity (1957) as Vickie Harker
 Kill Me Tomorrow (1957) as Jill Brook
 Face of Fire (1959) as Ethel Winter
 The Unstoppable Man (1961) as Helen Kennedy
 Lolita (1962) as Nurse Mary Lore
 Dr. No (1962) as Miss Moneypenny
 Come Fly with Me (1963) as Gwen Sandley
 The Haunting (1963) as Grace Markway
 From Russia with Love (1963) as Miss Moneypenny
 Goldfinger (1964) as Miss Moneypenny
 Thunderball (1965) as Miss Moneypenny
 Operation Kid Brother (1967) as Max
 You Only Live Twice (1967) as Miss Moneypenny 
 On Her Majesty's Secret Service (1969) as Miss Moneypenny
 The Adventurers (1970) as Woman at Fashion Show (uncredited)
 Diamonds Are Forever (1971) as Miss Moneypenny
 Endless Night (1972) as Cora Walker Brown
 Live and Let Die (1973) as Miss Moneypenny
 The Man with the Golden Gun (1974) as Miss Moneypenny
 From Hong Kong with Love (1975) as Miss Moneypenny
 Age of Innocence (1977) as Mrs. Hogarth
 The Spy Who Loved Me (1977) as Miss Moneypenny
 Moonraker (1979) as Miss Moneypenny
 Lost and Found (1979) as English Woman
 Mr. Patman (1980) as Director
 For Your Eyes Only (1981) as Miss Moneypenny
 Octopussy (1983) as Miss Moneypenny
 A View to a Kill (1985) as Miss Moneypenny
 The Blue Man (1985) as Monica Duval
 Martha, Ruth and Edie (1988) as Edie Carmichael
 The Fourth Angel (2001) as Olivia (final film role)

Television

 Danger Man (1960) as Sandi Lewis
 One Step Beyond: "The Room Upstairs" (1961) as Esther Hollis
 Zero One (1962) as Miss. Smith
 The Avengers - episode - The Little Wonders (1964) as Sister Johnson
 Ghost Squad (1964) as Elizabeth Creasey
 Stingray (1964) as Lieutenant Atlanta Shore / Milly Carson / Marinville Tracking Station (voice)
 The Baron (1965) as Charlotte Russell
 Gideon's Way episode The Millionaire's Daughter (1965) as Felisa Henderson
 The Saint: "Interlude in Venice" (1966-1967) as Beth Parish / Helen
 The Saint: "Simon and Delilah"  (1967) as Beth Parish
 Randall and Hopkirk (Deceased) (1969) as Kim Wentworth
 Adventures in Rainbow Country (1969-1970) as Nancy Williams
 Department S (1970) as Mary Burnham
 Omnibus - episode - Ian Fleming Creator of the James Bond Myth (1970) as Herself
 UFO: "The Cat with Ten Lives" (1970) & "The Man Who Came Back" (1971) as Miss Holland
 The Persuaders! (1972) as Louise Cornell
 Front Page Challenge (Episode -  Meet Miss Moneypenny) (1981) as Herself 
 Alfred Hitchcock Presents (1987) as Ms. Golden
 E! True Hollywood Story - Documentary (Episode - The Bond Girls)

Miscellaneous

 James Bond: Licence to Thrill - TV Movie documentary (1987) as Herself
 In Search of James Bond with Jonathan Ross - TV Movie documentary (1995) as Miss Moneypenny 
 Behind the Scenes with 'Thunderball - Video documentary (1995) as Herself / Miss Moneypenny
 Inside 'Octopussy''' - Video documentary short (2000) as Herself 
 Terence Young: Bond Vivant  - documentary video short (2000) as Herself 
 Inside 'Dr. No - Video documentary short (2000) as Herself
 James Bond: A BAFTA Tribute - TV Movie documentary (2000) as Herself

References

External links

 
 
 Obituary in The Times'', 1 October 2007
 "Miss Moneypenny Lives Here", Australian Broadcasting Corporation, 14 January 2005

1927 births
2007 deaths
20th-century Canadian actresses
21st-century Canadian actresses
Actresses from Toronto
Alumni of RADA
Canadian expatriate actresses in the United States
Canadian emigrants to Australia
Canadian emigrants to England
Canadian expatriates in Italy
Canadian film actresses
Canadian women in World War II
Canadian television actresses
Canadian voice actresses
Deaths from cancer in Western Australia
Deaths from colorectal cancer
New Star of the Year (Actress) Golden Globe winners
Actresses from Kitchener, Ontario
People from Oakville, Ontario
Actresses from Perth, Western Australia
Canadian female military personnel
Toronto Sun people